Rzuchowa  is a village in the administrative district of Gmina Pleśna, within Tarnów County, Lesser Poland Voivodeship, in southern Poland.

The village has an approximate population of 2000.

References

Rzuchowa